Mystery of Burma: Beyond The Dotehtawady is Burmese adventure and action movie directed by Arkar and starring Nine Nine, Joe Moreira, Ah Moon and Naw Aung. The film was produced by Golden Hour Entertainment.

The movie was officially released on May 4, 2018 at cinemas around Myanmar and 12 September 2018 at Singapore.

Cast
Nine Nine as Htet Paing, the character of the movie who has just returned to Myanmar from Europe
Ah Moon as Saung Nandar
Zaw Zaw Aung as Aung Min
Naw Aung as Gangster 
Joe Moreira as George
San Htut as Sheriff Thura

References

2018 films
Burmese action films